Babolbam (also Romanized as Bābolbām and Bāb ol Bām) is a village in Beyza Rural District, Beyza District, Sepidan County, Fars Province, Iran. At the 2006 census, its population was 403, in 102 families.

References 

Populated places in Beyza County